The women's street competition at the 2018 Asian Games took place on 29 August at the JSC Skateboard Stadium.

Schedule
All times are Western Indonesia Time (UTC+07:00)

Results

References

External links
Official website

Women's street